The discography of Canadian trumpeter Maynard Ferguson consists of 45 studio albums, 8 live albums, 12 compilations, 23 singles, along with many contributions as sideman, backing orchestra, or member of a studio orchestra.

As leader

Albums

Studio albums 

Notes

Live albums

Compilation albums 
 This list of compilations does not include any releases that are simply bundles of 2 or more complete albums.

Box sets

Singles 

Notes

As sideman

Studio albums

Live albums

As backing orchestra

Appearances

Live albums

Compilation albums

Soundtrack albums

References

External links 
 
 
 

Jazz discographies
Discographies of Canadian artists